Over Silton is a village and civil parish in the Hambleton district of North Yorkshire, England, about  east of Northallerton and on the border of the North York Moors. The population taken at the 2011 Census was less than 100, and so detailed information is included in the civil parish of Nether Silton. The population was estimated to be 70 at the time of the 2011 census by North Yorkshire County Council. This had dropped to 60 by 2015.

History

The village is mentioned in the Domesday Book as Sileutune in the Allerton hundred. At the time of the Norman Invasion, Over Silton Manor was the possession of Arnketil, afterwards it became the possession of the Crown. The Crown granted the manor as a mense lordship first to the Mowbray family and then to the Malbiche of Kirby Knowle until the 13th century. In 1257, Geoffrey de Upsall was granted demense land. After this succession followed the Upsall descent until it was sold to the Askwith family who held it until the end of the 16th century. In the mid 17th century the manor was sold to Thomas, Lord Fauconberg of Newburgh. His descendant, Sir George Wombwell sold the manor to William Wainman in 1866.

The toponymy of the name could be either from the Old Norse name Scylfa or the Anglian word, Scelf meaning shelf, both combined with the Old English suffix tun for settlement. The Over distinguishes it as the higher village named Silton.

Folklore

To the north-west of the village is a cave known Hobbthrush Hall, formerly as Hobby Hole. Local legend has it that a Goblin lived here that churned the local farmers milk into cream at night.

Governance

The village is within the Richmond (North Yorkshire) UK Parliament constituency. It is within the North Hambleton electoral division of North Yorkshire County Council and the Osmotherley ward of Hambleton District Council.

Geography

The nearest settlements are Nether Silton  to the south-east and Thimbleby  to the north.

Religion

There is a church in the village dedicated to St Mary situated 500 yards to the east of the village. The 12th century building is grade II* listed, as are some of the tombstones and headstones.

References

External links

Villages in North Yorkshire
Civil parishes in North Yorkshire